Jackson station may refer to:

Jackson Station, Indiana, an unincorporated community in Tipton County
Jackson station (CTA Blue Line), a subway station in Chicago, Illinois, also called Jackson/Dearborn station
Jackson station (CTA Red Line), a subway station in Chicago, Illinois, also called Jackson/State station
Jackson station (Michigan), an Amtrak station in Jackson, Michigan
Jackson Avenue (IRT White Plains Road Line), a subway station in Bronx, New York
Jackson/Euclid station, a light rail station in Salt Lake City, Utah
Jackson Street station, a trolley stop in Media, Pennsylvania
Jackson Street electric railway station, a former light railway halt in Grimsby, England 
Union Station (Jackson, Mississippi)

See also
Jackson (disambiguation)